Professor Warren Meck (17 November 1956 – 21 January 2020) was a professor in psychology and neuroscience at Duke University. His main field of interest was Interval-Timing mechanisms and subjective time perception. He was editor in chief in the journal of Timing & Time Perception. He introduced an interesting time perception model in 1984 and 2005. He explained that time is created in a dedicated module in the certain internal clock. Meck has over 19,000 citations in google scholar.

Education

 Ph.D., Psychology, Brown University, 1982
 B.A., Psychology, University of California, San Diego, 1978

Noteworthy Articles

Meck, W. H., & Church, R. M. (1983). A mode control model of counting and timing processes. Journal of Experimental Psychology: Animal Behavior Processes, 9(3), 320.

Meck, W. H. (1996). Neuropharmacology of timing and time perception. Cognitive brain research, 3(3), 227–242.

Gibbon, J., Church, R. M., & Meck, W. H. (1984). Scalar timing in memory. Annals of the New York Academy of sciences, 423(1), 52–77.

Buhusi, Catalin V., and Warren H. Meck. "What makes us tick? Functional and neural mechanisms of interval timing." Nature Reviews Neuroscience 6.10 (2005): 755–765.

Meck, Warren H. "Selective adjustment of the speed of internal clock and memory processes." Journal of Experimental Psychology: Animal Behavior Processes 9.2 (1983): 171.

Yin, B., & Meck, W. H. (2014). Comparison of interval timing behaviour in mice following dorsal or ventral hippocampal lesions with mice having δ-opioid receptor gene deletion. Philosophical Transactions of the Royal Society of London B: Biological Sciences, 369(1637), 20120466.

Coull, J. T., Cheng, R. K., & Meck, W. H. (2011). Neuroanatomical and neurochemical substrates of timing. Neuropsychopharmacology, 36(1), 3-25.

Awards, honors and distinctions

Warren H. Meck,
        January, 2012
        Project Advisor,
        NSF supported “Exploring Time” exhibit, Science Museum of Minnesota, St. Paul, MN,
        2000–present
        Chair – Awards Committee,
        American Psychological Association, Division 6,
        2003-2004
        CNRS Associate "Rouge" Research Scientist Fellowship,
        UPR 640, Paris, France,
        2003
        Participating Faculty,
        Functional Magnetic Resonance Imaging, An Introductory Course, Medical College of Wisconsin,
        October 23–25, 2003
        James McKeen Cattell Sabbatical Fellowship,
        2002-2003
        Chair,
        Behavioral Neuroscience Program (BBBP-5),
        2000
        Project Advisor,
        NSF supported “Exploring Time” exhibit, Science Museum of Minnesota, St. Paul, MN,
        January, 2000–2003
        Invited Plenary Lecturer,
        XXVI International Ethological Conference,
        August 2–9, 1999
        Project Advisor,
        NSF supported "Exploring Time" exhibit, Science Museum of Minnesota, St. Paul, MN,
        1999-2002
        Visiting Scientist,
        Max Planck Institute of Cognitive Neuroscience, Leipzig, Germany,
        1999
        Fellow of the American Psychological Society,
        elected 1998
        Panel Member,
        Cognitive Neuroscience Program, Special Emphasis Panel, NIMH,
        1998-1999
        Project Advisor,
        "What Makes Us Tick?", a British Broadcasting Company documentary,
        1998
        James S. McDonnell Fellowship,
        Summer Institute in Cognitive Neuroscience, Dartmouth College, Hanover, NH,
        1997
        Sponsor,
        National Research Service Award Fellowships,
        1997-2000
        Fellow of the American Psychological Association,
        elected 1996
        Investigator,
        Mental Health Clinical Research Center, Department of Psychiatry, UNC, Chapel Hill,
        1996–present
        Panel Member,
        Basic Behavioral Sciences Services Research Subcommittee, NIDA,
        1995-1999
        Sponsor,
        Wellcome Trust Advanced Training Fellowship,
        1995-1998
        Early Career Recognition Award,
        Eastern Psychological Association,
        1994
        Panel Member,
        Neurobiology of Cognition and Behavior Committee, NINDS/NIH,
        1993
        Special Reviewer,
        Psychobiology and Behavior Committee, NIMH,
        1993
        Alfred P. Sloan Foundation Research Fellowship in Neuroscience,
        1988-1990
        FIRST Award,
        NINCDS: Fundamental Neurosciences Program,
        1988
        James McKeen Cattell Dissertation Award,
        The New York Academy of Sciences,
        1982
        Sigma Xi,
        Brown University Chapter,
        0 1982

References

1956 births
2020 deaths
21st-century American psychologists
Duke University faculty
Brown University alumni
University of California, San Diego alumni